The Gadara Aqueduct, also called Qanatir Fir'awn or Qanat Fir'aun (Pharaoh's Watercourse), was a Roman aqueduct supplying water for some of the cities of the Decapolis. It serviced Adraha (known today as Dera'a in Syria), Abila (at Wadi Queilebh in Jordan), and Gadara (modern-day Umm Qais in Jordan). The aqueduct has the longest known tunnel of the Classical era.

In this special case, nearly all the shafts were diagonal at 45–60 degrees, with stairs to the real water channel inside the mountain. The line went along steep slopes and collected water from sources around the area. The first visitor who rode along the "Kanatir" was U. J. Seetzen in 1805.

The aqueduct starts at a Roman dam in Dilli (al-Dali, also spelled el-Dilli, Eldili, ad-Dili, c. 7 km north of the sub-district residence town of Al-Shaykh Maskin, Izra District, Daraa Governorate, Syria). From there, this part of the aqueduct line crosses several wadis via  bridges.

East of Adraha was a  bridge. The remains of the bridge now can be found on the ground of the new Al Saad Dam located at the eastern suburbs of Dera'a. After a junction point with a side channel from the Muzayrib lake, the underground aqueduct begins. Three water systems have been found near Gadara (Umm Qais). The first and second were built with qanat technology, and the third was built as a channel along a street. It is believed that all three systems were used, but each at a different period.

Claims of underground city
Beneath the classical city of Adraha was an underground city, and was also part of the aqueduct. The inhabitants of the city collected water by jars on ropes, from the underground channel. Today, however, there is no sign of the "underground city" which was described by Wetzstein in 1860 and G. Schumacher in 1896.

See also
Ancient Roman technology
Roman engineering
List of aqueducts in the Roman Empire
List of Roman aqueducts by date

References

Bibliography
 Döring, Mathias, "Qanat Firaun. 106 km langer unterirdischer Aquädukt im nordjordanischen Bergland, Schriften der Deutschen Wasserhistorischen Gesellschaft, Vol. 10 (2008), pp. 1–16
 Döring, Mathias, "Wasser für die Dekapolis - Jordanisches Bergland birgt längsten bisher bekannten Aquädukttunnel. Ein Zwischenbericht. Deutsches Archäologisches Institut, Forschungs Cluster 2, Berlin 2012, 225-243.
 Döring, Mathias, "Wasser für die Dekapolis. Römische Fernwasserleitung in Syrien und Jordanien. Deutsche Wasserhistorische Gesellschaft Vol. S 12, 2016, pp. 1–248, .
 Döring, Mathias, "Roman Water Systems in Northern Jordan", Proceedings of the 12th International Congress on the History of Water Management and Hydraulic Engineering in the Mediterranean Region (Ephesus, Oct. 2004), Österreichisches Archäologisches Institut, Sonderschriften, Vol. 42 (Leuven, 2006), pp. 237–243

External links

 Rome's tremendous tunnel. The Ancient World's Longest Underground Aqueduct, Spiegel Online 
 Qanat Fir'aun, the more than 150 km long Decapolis Aqueduct in Syria and Jordan, Jens Kleb International
 Gadara (Jordan), romanaqueducts.info

Persian developed underground aqueducts
Buildings and structures completed in the 2nd century
Aqueducts in Jordan
Roman aqueducts outside Rome
Archaeological sites in Jordan
Roman sites in Jordan
Ancient Greek archaeological sites in Western Asia
Ancient history of Jordan
Hellenistic sites